Pedro Torres was a Roman Catholic prelate who served as Auxiliary Bishop of Cassano all'Jonio (1540–1544?)

Biography
On 27 Aug 1540, Pedro Torres was appointed during the papacy of Pope Paul III as Auxiliary Bishop of Cassano all'Jonio and Titular Bishop of Albanen. While bishop, he was the principal co-consecrator of Bartolomé de las Casas, Bishop of Chiapas (1544).

References 

16th-century Italian Roman Catholic bishops
Bishops appointed by Pope Paul III